TV2, formerly Canal Algérie, in English means The Algerian channel, is the second Algerian general public national television channel. The channel is part of the EPTV Group which also includes TV1, TV3, TV4, TV5, TV6, TV7, TV8 and TV9.
The channel broadcasts its programs 24/7 via different platforms and all over the world.

Programming

Programming blocs 
 Enfants (Children)
 Documentaire (Documentaries)
 Sport (Sports)
 Cinéma (Movies)
 Musiques (Music)

News 
 12h Journal (Midday News in French)
 ⵉⵙⴰⵍⴻⵏ 18h (Issalen 18h) | 18h Journal (Six o'clock news in Tamazight)
 19h Journal (Seven o'clock news in French)
 Akhbar Al thamina | أخبار الثامنة (Eight o'clock news in Arabic)
 English News Edition (This newsflash airs late at night)
 Météo (Weather bulletin)

Television shows

Series & soap operas 
 ‘Imārat al-Hāj Lekhdher
 A‘ṣāb wa Awtār
 Adh-Dhikrá al-Akhīrá
 Aḥlām Mu’ajjalah
 Al-Bedhrah
 Al-Ḥarīq
 Al-Imtiḥān aṣ-Ṣa‘b
 Al-Lā‘ib
 Aṣ-Ṣāḥah
 Axxam n Dda Mezian
 Bin'o Bine
 Bint Walad
 Bibiche w Bibicha
 Chahra
 Caméra Café
 Dhākirat al-Jassad
 Djemai Family
 Dumū‘ al-Qalb
 Hob Fi Kafas El Itiham
 Koul Chi Aâdi
 Kouloub Fi Siraa
 Le Joueur
 Nass Mlah City
 Nūr al-Fajr
 Qahwet Mīmūn
 Qulūb fī Sirā‘
 Qulūb Taḥt ar-Ramād
 Rendez-vous avec le destin
 Saad El-Gat
 Samt El Abriyaa
 sihr el mordjane
 Shitā’ Bārid
 Sūq al-Hāj Lekhdher
 Taht El Moura9aba
 Qoloub Tahta Ramad
 Boudhou (Algeria)
 Switchers (Algeria)
 Shafiqa
 Al michwar

Animes 
 Adventures of the Little Koala

Documentaries 
 The Gurus Explore

Sports competitions 
 Algerian Football Cup
 Algerian Basketball Cup

On air staff 
 Radia Boulmaali

Logos

See also 
 Public Establishment of Television
 Television in Algeria
 List of French language television channels

References

External links 
  
  
 
 
 

French-language television stations
Television stations in Algeria
Television channels and stations established in 1994